At Budokan, At the Budokan, Live at Budokan or Live at the Budokan may refer to:

1970s:
 Live at the Budokan (Ian Gillan Band album), 1977 album by Ian Gillan Band
 Cheap Trick at Budokan, 1978 album by Cheap Trick
 Bob Dylan at Budokan, 1979 album by Bob Dylan
 Live in Budokan, 1979 live album by Pink Lady

1980s:
 One Night at Budokan, 1981 album by the Michael Schenker Group
 Quincy Jones Live at Budokan, 1981 album by Quincy Jones
 Willie Nelson Live at Budokan, 1984 album by Willie Nelson

1990s:
 Live at Budokan (Stormtroopers of Death album), 1992 album by Stormtroopers of Death
 Hiatt Comes Alive at Budokan?, 1994 album by John Hiatt
 Live at the Budokan (Blur album), 1996 album by Blur
 Live at Budokan (Mr. Big album), 1997 album by Mr. Big
 Live at the Budokan (Chic album), 1999 album by Chic

2000s:
 Live at Budokan (Ozzy Osbourne album), 2002 album by Ozzy Osbourne
 Live at the Budokan (Bryan Adams album), 2003 CD/DVD by Bryan Adams
 Live at Budokan, 2003 album by Sheryl Crow
 Live at Budokan (Dream Theater album), 2004 album by Dream Theater
 Live at Budokan (2005 film), 2005 concert video by Butch Walker
 Live at Budokan: Bonez Tour, 2005 album by Avril Lavigne
 Eizō Sakuhinshū Vol. 2, 2005 live DVD by Asian Kung-Fu Generation
 Zone Final Live in Nippon Budokan, 2005 live concert by Zone
 Budōkaaaaaaaaaan!!!!!, 2009 live DVD by Perfume (Japanese band)
 Back to Budokan, 2009 live album by Mr. Big 
 Joe Hisaishi in Budokan: 25 years with the Animations of Hayao Miyazaki, 2009 live concert by Joe Hisaishi with Tokyo Symphony Orchestra
 Dancing at Budokan!!, 2009 live album by Superfly

2010s:
 Uroboros: With the Proof in the Name of Living... - At Nippon Budokan, 2010 live DVD by Dir En Grey
 This Is my Budokan?!, 2011 live DVD by One Ok Rock
 SCANDAL Japan Title Match Live 2012 – SCANDAL vs Budokan by Scandal
 Experienced II: Embrace Tour 2013 Budokan, live album and video by Boom Boom Satellites
 Live at Budokan: Red Night & Black Night Apocalypse, 2015 live video album by Babymetal